Jagdishpur is a town, community development block, and former pargana in Musafirkhana tehsil of Amethi district, Uttar Pradesh, India. It is also called Nihalgarh, Chak Jangla, or Nihalgarh-Jagdispur. The distinction is that Jagdishpur was the original village, Chak Jangla was an outlying hamlet of Jagdishpur, and Nihalgarh was a fort built in Chak Jangla in the early 1700s and that no longer exists. The town is located at the crossroads between the Lucknow-Jaunpur and Raebareli-Faizabad highways.

History
Jagdishpur was originally named after a Brahmin zamindar named Jagdis who lived at the time when the area was ruled by the Bhars. In 1715, the Bhale Sultan leader Nihal Khan established a fort at the outlying hamlet of Chak Jangla. He named the fort Nihalgarh after himself, and a town sprang up around it that came to eclipse Jagdishpur proper. In 1750, the tehsildar Mirza Latif Beg besieged and captured Nihalgarh; he then made it his residence. Up to that time, there had been two parganas in the area at Kishni and Sathin (or Satanpur), but either Nihal Khan or Mirza Latif Beg united the two parganas into one based at Jagdishpur. Sometime after 1750 but before the 20th century, the fort of Nihalgarh was torn down.

At the turn of the 20th century, the town of Jagdishpur/Nihalgarh had a police station, a middle vernacular school with about 150 students, and a registration office located at the Gulabganj sarai. It also had a small bazar, which mostly dealt in everyday goods like food and clothing, as well as brass vessels made by the Thatheras. There was only one masonry house, which had been built by a wealthy Agarwal Bania named Balmukand who had acquired a small estate by purchase and mortgage. Balmukand's successor, Bibi Rampiari, owned seven villages and two pattis in the area at the time. As of 1901, the population of the town was 2,121 people, including 1,168 Muslims.

The 1951 census recorded Jagdishpur as having a district board-run primary school, with 197 students in attendance as of 1 January of the year.

The 1961 census recorded Jagdishpur as having a police force of 2 sub-inspectors, 1 head constable, and 14 constables. It had a dispensary run by a local body with 12 male beds and 8 female beds, a maternity and child welfare centre, and a post office. Average attendance of the Dussehra festival was about 1,500 people then.

Villages
Jagdishpur CD block has the following 91 villages:

References

Cities and towns in Sultanpur district
Community development blocks in India